An extended period of significant tornado activity affected the Midwest and Southern United States from April 19 to April 24, 2011, with 134 tornadoes being spawned across six days. The outbreak produced an EF4 tornado that tore through the St. Louis metropolitan area on April 22, while other tornadoes caused damage in Illinois, Indiana, Ohio, Kentucky, Texas, Oklahoma, and other parts of Missouri during the period. No fatalities were reported in this outbreak. This event was directly followed by the largest tornado outbreak in the history of the United States.

Meteorological synopsis

April 19–20
A severe weather event developed across the Midwest and southern Great Plains on April 19 as a dynamic low pressure system tracked across the area. Thunderstorms began in the late afternoon and early evening with large hail and several tornadoes. Significant damage was reported near Bowling Green, Missouri and Girard, Illinois as a result of an EF3 tornado. The individual storm cells later merged into a very large squall line. Overnight, the squall line tracked eastward with widespread wind damage and many embedded tornadoes across several states. A few tornadoes were as strong as EF2, but most were brief and weak.

April 22
Severe weather once again developed across parts of the Midwest on April 22. The St. Louis metropolitan area was hit hardest by the storm system. An EF4 tornado tracked across the region. Severe effects occurred in several communities, including houses and other buildings destroyed in Bridgeton, Ferguson, Florissant, Hazelwood, Maryland Heights, New Melle, and other communities. The tornado caused extensive damage to numerous facilities at Lambert–St. Louis International Airport, with injuries reported; airplanes were damaged from the high winds and terminal windows blew out. American Airlines claimed four of their jets were damaged, two significantly.  The airport was closed for days after the tornado. The EF4 tornado rating was based on finding of leveled houses in Bridgeton. Following assessments by the local National Weather Service, it was determined that a single tornado tracked for 22 miles (35 km) through parts of Missouri and Illinois. It reached a maximum width of 0.4 miles (0.64 km). Elsewhere, there were several reported tornadoes, including an EF2 which tracked through Henderson, Webster, and Union counties.

April 23–24
Scattered tornadoes were reported across the United States, but most were weak or remained over open country. However, one EF2 tornado struck the town of Bardwell, Kentucky. Another EF2 tornado destroyed airplane hangars near Cairo, Illinois. Tornadoes were not part of the same weather system as the earlier tornadoes; they were part of a weather system that led to the 2011 Super Outbreak.

Confirmed tornadoes

April 19 event

April 20 event

April 21 event

April 22 event

April 23 event

April 24 event

St. Louis, Missouri–Madison County, Illinois

This powerful tornado began near Creve Coeur Lake at 7:59 p.m. CDT (00:59 UTC) and moved into Maryland Heights, producing EF3 damage. The tornado continued eastward and reached EF4 intensity in Bridgeton, where a number of houses were completely destroyed. Afterwards the tornado traveled parallel to Interstate 70 and struck Lambert–St. Louis International Airport at EF2 intensity about 8:10 p.m. CDT (01:10 UTC). It blew out numerous windows and peeled away a large section of roof. The tornado then moved into the Berkeley neighborhood where it continued to produce EF2 damage, tearing the roofs from several homes. The tornado continued on through several more neighborhoods, causing roof damage to a church and two businesses in Ferguson, one of which completely experienced total roof loss. The storm also produced extensive tree damage and some roof damage to homes as well as partially removing the roof of an elementary school. Damage along this entire section of the storm's path was rated EF1 to low-end EF2. The tornado continued toward the Mississippi River resulting in mostly EF1 damage to trees, however EF2 damage occurred in Dellwood where extensive tree and utility pole damage occurred, and three homes lost their roofs. EF2 damage continued as the tornado crossed the Mississippi River into Madison County, Illinois, where about a hundred homes were damaged, three of which completely lost their roofs, and numerous trees were uprooted and snapped. The tornado dissipated at 8:31 p.m. CDT (01:31 UTC) in the northeastern part of Granite City, Illinois.

Notes

References

External links
For the latest severe weather information:
National Weather Service
Storm Prediction Center

Tornado,2011-04-19
F4 tornadoes by date
Tornadoes in Alabama
Tornadoes in Arkansas
Tornadoes in Illinois
Tornadoes in Indiana
Tornadoes in Kentucky
Tornadoes in Mississippi
Tornadoes in Missouri
Tornadoes in Ohio
Tornadoes in Oklahoma
Tornadoes in Texas
04-19
Tornado outbreak sequence